BA25 may refer to:

Brodmann area 25 (BA25) area in the cerebral cortex of the brain
Breda Ba.25 Italian two-seat biplane trainer designed and built by the Breda company
BA25 (album), album by the Baby Animals